Bilal Irshad (born 1 February 1991) is a Pakistani cricketer. He made his first-class debut for Hyderabad in the 2010–11 Quaid-e-Azam Trophy on 22 November 2010.

References

External links
 

1991 births
Living people
Pakistani cricketers
Hyderabad (Pakistan) cricketers
Lahore Blues cricketers
Place of birth missing (living people)